USNS Private John F. Thorson (T-AK-247) was a US Maritime Administration (MARCOM) C1-M-AV1 type coastal cargo ship, originally planned as an . Constructed as Becket Bend for MARCOM, completed in August 1945 and placed in operation by the War Shipping Administration. However, the war ended, and she was transferred to the US Army as USAT Private John F. Thorson who kept her in service until transferred to the US Navy in 1950. She was struck in 1960, ending her military career.

Construction
Becket Bend was laid down under MARCOM contract, MC hull 2486, by the Southeastern Shipbuilding Corporation, Savannah, Georgia on 8 January 1945; launched 26 February 1945; sponsored by Mrs. L. S. deSevilla; and delivered via MARCOM to Moore–McCormack Lines, Inc., 6 July 1945.

As Becket Bend, the cargo ship was operated by Moore–McCormack under General Agency Agreement (GAA). Title for the ship was transferred from the War Shipping Administration to the Army 23 July 1954 and the actual transfer to custody took place two days later at New Orleans, Louisiana.

US Army service
Renamed Private John F. Thorson 31 October 1947, she operated as an Army Transportation Service ship until transferred to the Navy 1 March 1950.

US Navy service
Placed in service as T–AK–247, she was assigned to the Military Sea Transportation Service (MSTS) and operated from Gulf ports until 1954. Transferred to the Atlantic Reserve Fleet, Charleston Group, she decommissioned 2 August 1954 and was struck from the Navy List 1 October 1958.

Final inactivation
Private John F. Thorson remained at Charleston until transferred to the Maritime Administration (MARAD) 29 August 1960. The same day she was sold to Hugo New Steel Products, New York City, for scrap.

Notes 

Citations

Bibliography 

Online resources

External links

 

Ships built in Savannah, Georgia
1945 ships
Merchant ships of the United States
Type C1-M ships of the United States Army
Alamosa-class cargo ships